Carl Reinhold Sahlberg  (January 22, 1779, Eura – October 18, 1860, Yläne) was a Finnish naturalist, primarily an entomologist specializing in beetles.

Biography
In 1818 Carl Reinhold Sahlberg succeeded Carl Niclas Hellenius as professor of economy and natural history at Finland’s then only University in Turku (Åbo), the Academy of Åbo. In 1827 the town and the university were destroyed by fire. The remnants of the natural history collections were taken to Helsinki where the University then moved under the name of Imperial Alexander University in Finland (and eventually became University of Helsinki in 1918). Sahlberg replaced the lost collections, played a major role in establishing  a new botanical garden in Helsinki, and with his pupils organised a scientific society "Societas pro Fauna et Flora Fennica". Its only scope was natural history. The society widened to include other sectors of biology only in 1921.

Sahlberg's son Reinhold Ferdinand Sahlberg, grandson Johan Reinhold Sahlberg and his son Uunio Saalas were also entomologists.

Works
Dissertatio entomologica insecta Fennica enumerans (Coleoptera) 1834

Collections
Sahlberg's insect collection is in the Finnish Museum of Natural History.

References

External links

Biography in Swedish

1779 births
1860 deaths
People from Eura
Finnish entomologists
Academic staff of the University of Helsinki